Masaura or Masyaura is a fermented sun-dried vegetable balls made with a combination of various or single minced vegetables with black lentils. It originated in Nepal and is made by Nepali diaspora throughout the world. The choice of vegetables is mostly taro, yam, and colocasia leaf. As finding fresh vegetables was a hard all-around year in the earlier days, masyaura become an alternative nutritious food item when fresh vegetables weren’t available. It is fried in oil and made into a curry.

Etymology and history 
There is no exact or written proof, but local people believe the word itself derived from the word Maas (black lentils), given that maas is a key ingredient of masyaura preparation.

There is no such history on when who invented or start making masyaura, but it is likely one of the traditional preserved food items of Nepal.

Gallery

See also 

 Gundruk
 Sinki

References 

Nepalese cuisine
Lentil dishes
Vegetarian cuisine
Fermented foods